The 1789 New Hampshire's at-large congressional district special election was held on June 22, 1789 to fill a vacancy left by Representative-elect Benjamin West, who had declined to serve in the 1st United States Congress. This was the first special election in the history of the United States House of Representatives.

Election results

See also
 1788 and 1789 United States House of Representatives elections
 List of special elections to the United States House of Representatives

References

New Hampshire at-large
New Hampshire 1789 at-large
1789
New Hampshire at-large
United States House of Representatives at-large
United States House of Representatives 1789 at-large